The 1999 Brandenburg state election was held on 5 September 1999 to elect the members of the 3rd Landtag of Brandenburg. The incumbent Social Democratic Party (SPD) majority government led by Minister-President Manfred Stolpe lost its majority. The SPD subsequently formed a grand coalition with the Christian Democratic Union (CDU), and Stolpe continued as Minister-President.

Parties
The table below lists parties represented in the 2nd Landtag of Brandenburg.

Opinion polling

Election result

|-
! colspan="2" | Party
! Votes
! %
! +/-
! Seats 
! +/-
! Seats %
|-
| bgcolor=| 
| align=left | Social Democratic Party (SPD)
| align=right| 433,521
| align=right| 39.3
| align=right| 14.8
| align=right| 37
| align=right| 15
| align=right| 41.6
|-
| bgcolor=| 
| align=left | Christian Democratic Union (CDU)
| align=right| 292,634
| align=right| 26.5
| align=right| 7.8
| align=right| 25
| align=right| 7
| align=right| 28.1
|-
| bgcolor=| 
| align=left | Party of Democratic Socialism (PDS)
| align=right| 257,309
| align=right| 23.3
| align=right| 4.6
| align=right| 22
| align=right| 4
| align=right| 24.7
|-
| bgcolor=| 
| align=left | German People's Union (DVU)
| align=right| 58,247
| align=right| 5.3
| align=right| 5.3
| align=right| 5
| align=right| 5
| align=right| 2.6
|-
! colspan=8|
|-
| bgcolor=| 
| align=left | Alliance 90/The Greens (Grüne)
| align=right| 21,410
| align=right| 1.9
| align=right| 1.0
| align=right| 0
| align=right| ±0
| align=right| 0
|-
| bgcolor=| 
| align=left | Free Democratic Party (FDP)
| align=right| 20,472
| align=right| 1.9
| align=right| 0.3
| align=right| 0
| align=right| ±0
| align=right| 0
|-
| bgcolor=|
| align=left | Others
| align=right| 18,767
| align=right| 1.7
| align=right| 
| align=right| 0
| align=right| ±0
| align=right| 0
|-
! align=right colspan=2| Total
! align=right| 1,102,360
! align=right| 100.0
! align=right| 
! align=right| 89
! align=right| 1
! align=right| 
|-
! align=right colspan=2| Voter turnout
! align=right| 
! align=right| 54.3
! align=right| 2.0
! align=right| 
! align=right| 
! align=right| 
|}

Sources
 The Federal Returning Officer

Elections in Brandenburg
Brandenburg
September 1999 events in Europe